WPGM may refer to:

 WPGM (AM), a radio station (1570 AM) licensed to Danville, Pennsylvania, United States
 WPGM-FM, a radio station (96.7 FM) licensed to Danville, Pennsylvania, United States